Strange Peace is the third studio album by Canadian noise rock three-piece band METZ. It was released on September 22, 2017 through Sub Pop Records. Live-to-tape recording sessions took place at Electrical Audio in Chicago with Steve Albini, at the Woodshed in Toronto and at Baskitball 4 Life with Graham Walsh, and at the Nursery with member Alex Edkins. Production was handled by METZ.

Promotion and release
On July 11, 2017, the album was previewed with the release of the song "Cellophane" via streaming, along the way revealing the title of the album, its release date, track list, cover artwork and supporting tour. It was also revealed that the band have worked with Steve Albini, who provided live-to-tape recording of Strange Peace during four days at his Chicago-based studio Electrical Audio, which was booked for a week by the trio. On August 2, 2017, the group shared the second song from the album, "Drained Lake", for which an acompaying music video was released later in October 2017. The third promotional single from the album, "Mess of Wires", was released on August 22, 2017 also via streaming. The fourth and final promotional single, "Common Trash" was released in CDr format along with the album on September 22, 2017.

Celebrating 30 years of Sub Pop, the song "Escalator Teeth" b/w "On and On" was released as a part of 'SPF30 Singles Spectacular' series on September 27, 2018.

Critical reception

Strange Peace was met with generally favorable reviews from music critics. At Metacritic, which assigns a normalized rating out of 100 to reviews from mainstream publications, the album received an average score of 78 based on nineteen reviews. The aggregator AnyDecentMusic? has the critical consensus of the album at a 7.4 out of 10, based on twenty reviews.

Track listing

Personnel
Alex Edkins – lyrics, vocals, guitar, songwriter, producer, recording, mixing, art direction
Chris Slorach – bass, songwriter, producer, mixing, art direction
Hayden Menzies – drums, songwriter, producer, mixing, art direction
Graham Walsh – recording, mixing
Steve Albini – recording
Jeff Kleinsmith – art direction, design
Anna Edwards – live photography
Jonathan Bauerle – illustration

Charts

References

External links 

2017 albums
Metz (band) albums
Sub Pop albums